Nicola Kuhn was the defending champion but lost in the first round to Yannick Hanfmann.

Hanfmann won the title after defeating Jozef Kovalík 6–2, 3–6, 6–3 in the final.

Seeds

Draw

Finals

Top half

Bottom half

References
Main Draw
Qualifying Draw

Sparkassen Open - Singles
2018 Singles